The South Bank Parklands are located at South Bank within the suburb of South Brisbane in Brisbane, Queensland, Australia. The parkland, on the transformed site of Brisbane's World Expo 88, was officially opened to the public on 20 June 1992.

The South Bank Parklands are located on the southern bank of the Brisbane River, at South Bank, directly opposite the City. The parklands are connected to the City by the Victoria Bridge at the northern end, and to Gardens Point by the Goodwill Bridge at the southern end.

The parklands consist of a mixture of rainforest, water, grassed areas and plazas as well as features such as the riverfront promenade, the Streets Beach, the Grand Arbour, the Courier Mail Piazza, the Nepalese Peace Pagoda, the Wheel of Brisbane, restaurants, shops and fountains. The parklands are also home to the Queensland Conservatorium.

South Bank and its parklands are one of Brisbane's most important cultural precincts and they regularly host large scale festivals and events. Approximately 11,000,000 people visit South Bank Parklands each year.

History
South Bank was originally a meeting place for the traditional landowners, the Turrbal and Yuggera people and, in the early 1840s it became the central focus point of early European settlement. From the 1850s, South Bank Precinct was quickly established as the business centre of Brisbane. However, this was all disrupted when the 1893 Brisbane floods forced the central business district to shift to the northern side of the river and attain higher ground. This is where the Brisbane central business district still stands today. This began the decline of South Bank, and the area became home to vaudeville theatres, derelict boarding houses, and light and heavy industry.

The 1970s marked the beginnings of a new era, with parkland reclaimed along the river bank, and the Queensland Cultural Centre was built which included the Queensland Art Gallery, the Queensland Museum, the Queensland Performing Arts Centre and State Library of Queensland (today it also includes the Queensland Gallery of Modern Art).

In 1988, Brisbane held a successful World Expo 88, following which the Government intended to develop the site for commercial interests. However, a public campaign successfully lobbied for the site to be redeveloped as parkland for the enjoyment of people in Brisbane. In 1989, the South Bank Corporation, a Queensland Government statutory body, was established to oversee the development and management of the new South Bank Parklands. 

In 1998, a major redevelopment was announced that included the Goodwill Bridge, Grey Street, Grand Arbour and improvements to accessibility via removal of the canals and associated pathways.

In 2013, the South Bank Corporation contracted the Brisbane City Council to provide maintenance services and to manage the public green spaces, while Brisbane Marketing (a subsidiary of the council) manages the marketing and events. The Corporation retains responsibility for the commercial tenants, the carpark and the renewal planning.

Access and transport

Walking
The South Bank Parklands can be accessed from South Bank via Vulture Street, Little Stanley Street and the Cultural Forecourt; from the City via the Victoria Bridge; from Gardens Point via the Goodwill Bridge; and from Kangaroo Point via the Riverwalk.

Public transport
The South Bank Parklands are within walking distance of the Cultural Centre busway station and the South Bank busway station, as well as the South Brisbane railway station and South Bank railway station. There are three CityCat terminals on the Brisbane River, near the Victoria Bridge.

Bicycle
Bicycles can access the Brisbane, South Bank Parklands from South Bank via Vulture Street, Little Stanley Street and the Cultural Forecourt; from Gardens Point via the Goodwill Bridge; and from Kangaroo Point via the Riverwalk.  Bicycle racks are located at the Visitors Centre in Stanley Street Plaza, Suncorp Piazza, The Boardwalk, Clem Jones Promenade and Little Stanley Street.

Attractions

The Arbour

The Arbour consists of 443 curling steel columns covered in bougainvilleas which flower throughout the year.

South Bank Piazza
The South Bank Piazza (formerly Suncorp Piazza and Courier Mail Piazza) is an open-air amphitheater which is frequently used for community events. It has a seating capacity of 2,158. When not in use, the Piazza displays news and sports on two suspended screens.

Wheel of Brisbane

It carries 42 gondolas on a 15-minute ride with panoramic views of the South Bank Parklands, the Brisbane River, and the City.

Markets
The Young Designers Market is held on the first Sunday of every month (10:00am – 4:00pm), and features cutting edge garments and accessories from some of Brisbane's most talented young designers.

Nepalese Peace Pagoda

The Nepalese Peace Pagoda was originally located on the Expo site and was moved to its new South Bank Parklands riverfront location at the conclusion of the Expo after a successful government and private fundraising campaign to keep the Pagoda in Brisbane. With its traditional Nepali architecture, art work and first level meditation area, it is a popular attraction.

Restaurants and cafés
South Bank is a major dining precinct in Brisbane, and many establishments are situated inside the South Bank Parklands includes Ahmet's, Café San Marco, Chez Laila, Mado, River Canteen, The Plough Inn, Timmy's, Gandhi Curry House, Wang Dynasty. Directly on Streets Beach, South Bank Surf Club was opened by celebrity chef Ben O'Donoghue, and features seafood on its menu with a laid-back attitude. Immediately adjacent is Live Fire Steak Bar, an al fresco restaurant and function space with modern décor and features craft beers. The popular Boardwalk restaurants clustered at the southern end of the grounds, built for Expo 88, were demolished between 2009-13 and replaced with the contemporary restaurants along Clem Jones Promenade near the Goodwill Bridge.

Streets Beach

The sand surrounding the beach is sourced from the Rous Channel in Moreton Bay and every year the beach is topped up with an additional  to ensure that it is kept in pristine condition. Almost half of the lagoon area sits on reclaimed land that was once the Brisbane River.

The beach was designed by Desmond Brookes International and was constructed by Fletcher Jennings Construction and Water and Industrial Engineering. Construction commenced in February 1991 and was complete by June 1992. Water for the beach is pumped through two large sand filters and chemically treated before being pumped back into the pools. Dredge pump and self-propelled sifting machines clean the adjoining pools.

The beach has received awards including the 1999 Moreton Bay region's cleanest beach in the Keep Australia Beautiful Council's Clean Beach Challenge and the 2001 Environmental Protection Agency's Keep Australia Beautiful Clean Beach Challenge, Friendliest Beach Award. The beach area comprises a lagoon with enough water to fill five Olympic swimming pools, with sand beaches, palm trees, rocky creeks and subtropical trees and exotic plantings.

The beach is named after the sponsor Streets Ice Cream, and was formerly known as Kodak Beach. The beach is patrolled year round by lifeguards.

Former Attractions

Our World Environment
Our World Environment was a walk through attraction that included a recreation of Mawson's Huts. It closed in 1994.

South Ships
These were transport vessels which travelled along the canals that made up the park. They stopped operating in 1997 and the canals were removed as part the 1998 redevelopment.

Festivals and events
The South Bank Parklands host a number of annual cultural events and festivals including the Australia Day Festival, Riverfire and New Year's Eve celebrations. In 2009, Riverfire drew more than half a million spectators to the South Bank Parklands.

Awards 
In 2009, as part of the Q150 celebrations, South Bank Parklands was announced as one of the Q150 Icons of Queensland for its role as a "location".

Facilities

Parking
The Parklands Underground Carpark has more than 800 car parking spaces. Access is via Tribune Street or Glenelg Street, off Little Stanley Street.

 Another Parking options:
- Brisbane City Council King George square parking space : it is walking distance to  South Bank and parking rate is cheaper than South Bank parking space (example : Friday after 4:30 pm 3 hours parking : South Bank $25, King George Square :$5 flat rate)
- BCC street parking : first 15 minutes free with registration and hourly rate

Bathrooms and Showers
Showers are located in Stanley Street Plaza and there are five bathroom facilities

Internet Connectivity
Free internet access is available from the park area by 24 X 7
Limitations of Internet:  exceed the time limit of five hours and up to 512 kbps speed

Concept

When South Bank Parklands were developed following World Expo 88, there were canals, bridges and launches. There were also a wildlife refuge called Gondwana Rainforest Sanctuary as well as a Butterfly House. In January 1998, Gondwana Rainforest Sanctuary was closed down and the animals relocated.

The Butterfly House was later renamed as the Butterfly and Insect House. In April 1998, the Butterfly and Insect House was renamed as South Bank Wildlife Sanctuary, with the introduction of other wildlife. In the latter half of 2005, the South Bank Wildlife Sanctuary was closed and dismantled and an office and retail store were built on the South Bank Wildlife Sanctuary's former location. Also gone from South Bank Parklands are the canals, bridges and launches. Visitors were originally able to hire golf carts to tour the grounds as well. This attraction was also phased out with Gondwana Rainforest Sanctuary and the canals.

See also

 List of parks in Brisbane

References

Further reading

External links

Things to do — South Bank Corporation
Master Plan Redevelopment — South Bank Corporation
Visit South Bank Parklands
Discover the Brisbane River - CityCat Guide, Our Brisbane, Brisbane City Council (includes information about South Bank Parklands)
20th anniversary of the opening of the South Bank Parklands - John Oxley Library Blog, State Library of Queensland
Brisbane River and Southbank Photographs 2006, State Library of Queensland

Parks in Brisbane
Tourist attractions in Brisbane
World's fair sites in Australia
Culture of Brisbane
History of Brisbane
South Brisbane, Queensland
1992 establishments in Australia
Redeveloped ports and waterfronts in Australia
Venues of the 2032 Summer Olympics and Paralympics
Olympic archery venues
World Expo 88